Zaleplon, sold under the brand names Sonata among others, is a sedative and hypnotic which is used to treat insomnia. It is a nonbenzodiazepine or Z-drug of the pyrazolopyrimidine class.

It is manufactured by King Pharmaceuticals and Gedeon Richter Plc. It has been discontinued in Canada but can be manufactured if a prescription is brought to a compounding pharmacy. It was prescribed rarely in the United Kingdom, with zopiclone being the preferred Z-drug by the National Health Service (NHS) and is now unavailable.

Medical uses 
Zaleplon is slightly effective in insomnia, primarily characterized by difficulty falling asleep. Zaleplon significantly reduces the time required to fall asleep by improving sleep latency and may therefore facilitate sleep induction rather than sleep maintenance. Due to its ultrashort elimination half-life, zaleplon may not be effective in reducing premature awakenings; however, it may be administered to alleviate middle-of-the-night awakenings. However, zaleplon has not been empirically shown to increase total sleep time.

Zaleplon does not significantly affect driving performance the morning following bedtime administration or 4 hours after middle-of-the-night administration.  It may have advantages over benzodiazepines with fewer adverse effects.

Neither zaleplon, nor any nonbenzodiazepine hypnotic class medication should be combined with alcohol, as both modulate GABAA receptor sites, and in a synergistic manner increase the chances of fatal respiratory depression and asphyxiation from vomiting.

Special populations 
Zaleplon is not recommended for chronic use in the elderly. The elderly are more sensitive to the adverse effects of zaleplon such as cognitive side effects. Zaleplon may increase the risk of injury among the elderly. It should not be used while in pregnancy or lactation, and in patients with a history of alcohol or drug abuse, psychotic illness or depression, clinicians should devote more attention.

When compared with benzodiazepines, nonbenzodiazepines (including zaleplon) offer few significant advantages in efficacy and tolerability among elderly individuals. Long-term use of sedative/hypnotics for insomnia has traditionally been discouraged for reasons that include concerns about addiction and rebound insomnia, as well to the risk of side effects associated to GABAA agonists, such as cognitive impairment, anterograde amnesia, daytime sedation, musculoskeletal impairment, and subsequently an increased risk of harm to oneself (e.g. falling) and to others (e.g. automotive accidents). Though, quite obviously as the body and brain age, these aforementioned phenomena are expected events, as they occur daily regardless of ingestion of a sedative/hypnotic. Thus, statistically significant and empirical evidence are arguably still absent as dramatic precautions and conclusions are drawn irrespective of the debilitating realities that accompany insomnia and the fact that these medicines do indeed provide assistance to millions of elderly individuals. It is important to distinguish between the extrapolation of potential side effects relative to the vast number of examples, wherein the sedative/hypnotic has proven therapeutically beneficial and appropriate.

In addition, some contend the efficacy and safety of long-term use of these agents remains to be enumerated, but nothing concrete suggests long-term use poses any direct harm to a person. Still, as of today neither benzodiazepines nor nonbenzodiazepines are recommended for the long-term treatment of insomnia.

Adverse effects 

The adverse effects of zaleplon are similar to the adverse effects of benzodiazepines, although with less next-day sedation, and in two studies zaleplon use was found not to cause an increase in traffic accidents, as compared to other hypnotics currently on the market.

Sleeping pills, including zaleplon, have been associated with an increased risk of death.

Available data cannot provide a reliable estimate of the incidence of dependence during treatment at recommended doses of zaleplon (typically 5–20 mg before bed).  Other sedative/hypnotics have been associated with various signs and symptoms of a withdrawal syndrome, following abrupt discontinuation, ranging from mild dysphoria and insomnia to more serious cases that include abdominal and muscle cramps, vomiting, sweating, tremors, and convulsions. Following abrupt cessation, the seizure threshold is further lowered, wherein coma and death are possible outcomes if untreated.

Some evidence suggests zaleplon is not as chemically reinforcing and exhibits far fewer rebound effects when compared with other nonbenzodiazepines, or Z-drugs.

Interactions 
Cimetidine, rifampicin, and thioridazine cause interactions with zaleplon.

Cimetidine and grapefruit are known to increase blood plasma concentrations of benzodiazepines metabolized by the P450 CYP3A4 liver enzyme (e.g. alprazolam) by extending the time by which the drug leaves the body, effectively extending the half-life and enhancing effects to potentially toxic levels. Thus, given the similarities between zaleplon and benzodiazepines, particularly in effect and not just chemical structure, it is reasonable to take precautions (e.g. inquire at a pharmacy) before one consumes cimetidine (or grapefruit) while also taking zaleplon.

Pharmacology

Mechanism of action

Zaleplon is a high-selectivity, high-affinity ligand of positive modulator sites of GABAA receptors, which enhances GABAergic inhibition of neurotransmission in the central nervous system.  The ultrashort half-life gives zaleplon a unique advantage over other hypnotics because of its lack of next-day residual effects on driving and other performance-related skills. Unlike nonselective benzodiazepine drugs and zopiclone, which distort the sleep pattern, zaleplon appears to induce sleep without disrupting the natural sleep architecture.

A meta-analysis of randomized, controlled clinical trials which compared benzodiazepines against zaleplon or other Z-drugs such as zolpidem, zopiclone, and eszopiclone has found few clear and consistent differences between zaleplon and the benzodiazepines in terms of sleep onset latency, total sleep duration, number of awakenings, quality of sleep, adverse events, tolerance, rebound insomnia, and daytime alertness.

Zaleplon has a pharmacological profile similar to benzodiazepines, characterized by an increase in slow wave deep sleep (SWDS) with rapid onset of hypnotic action. Zaleplon is a full agonist for the benzodiazepine α1 receptor located on the GABAA receptor complex in the body, with lower affinity for the α2 and α3 subsites. It selectively enhances the action of GABA similar to, but more selectively than benzodiazepines. Zaleplon, although not a benzodiazepine, maintains a very similar pharmacological profile nonetheless, known for inducing hypnotic effects by α1 subreceptor sites, anxiolytic and muscle relaxant effects via α2 and α3 subsites, with negligible anticonvulsant properties (via α5 subsite), as zaleplon action is modulated at benzodiazepine receptor sites. The elimination half-life of zaleplon is about 1–1.5 hours. The onset of therapeutic effects is typically breached within 15 minutes following ingestion.

Zaleplon should be understood as an ultrashort-acting sedative-hypnotic drug for the treatment of insomnia. Zaleplon increases EEG power density in the δ-frequency band and a decrease in the energy of the θ-frequency band

Pharmacokinetics 
Zaleplon is primarily metabolised by aldehyde oxidase into 5-oxozaleplon, and its half-life can be affected by substances which inhibit or induce aldehyde oxidase. It is secondarily metabolized by CYP3A4 to form desethylzaleplon, which is quickly metabolized by aldehyde oxidase to 5-oxodesethylzaleplon. All of these metabolites are inactive. When taken orally, zaleplon reaches full concentration in about 45 minutes. It is extensively metabolised with less than 1% of it excreted intact in urine.

Chemistry 
Zaleplon is classified as a pyrazolopyrimidine. Pure zaleplon in its solid state is a white to off-white powder with very low solubility in water, as well as low solubility in ethanol and propylene glycol. It has a constant octanol-water partition coefficient of log P = 1.23 in the pH range between 1 and 7.

Synthesis 

The synthesis starts with the condensation of 3-acetylacetanilide (1) with N,N-dimethylformamide dimethyl acetal (DMFDMA) to give the eneamide (2). The anilide nitrogen is then alkylated by means of sodium hydride and ethyl iodide to give 3. The first step in the condensation with 3-amino-4-cyanopyrazole can be visualized as involving an addition-elimination reaction sequence on the eneamide function to give a transient intermediate such as 5. Cyclization then leads to formation of the fused pyrimidine ring to afford zaleplon (6).

Society and culture

Recreational use 
Zaleplon has the potential to be a drug of recreational use, and has been found to have an addictive potential similar to benzodiazepine and benzodiazepine-like hypnotics. The mind- and judgment-altering effects of zaleplon are similar to those of many benzodiazepines, but the fast-acting nature and short half-life of the chemical mean high doses set on much more quickly and last for short periods of time (usually from 45 to 60 minutes).

Some individuals use a different delivery method than prescribed, such as insufflation, to induce effects faster.  

A common effect of recreational zaleplon use is the occurrence of (typically short-lived) hallucinations. Fewer visual and auditory hallucinations/disruptions occur with the use of zaleplon than with other Z-drugs, like zolpidem.   Anterograde amnesia can occur and can cause one to lose track of the amount of zaleplon already ingested, prompting the ingesting of more than originally planned. However, continuous ingestion is extremely unlikely precisely because of zaleplon's quick onset of action.

The combination of alcohol and zaleplon can result in fatal respiratory depression and asphyxiation from vomiting.

Aviation use 
The Federal Aviation Administration allows zaleplon with a 12-hour wait period and no more than twice a week, which makes it the sleep medication with the shortest allowed waiting period after use. The substances with the 2nd shortest period, which is of 24 hours, are zolpidem and ramelteon.

Military use 
The United States Air Force uses zaleplon as one of the hypnotics approved as a "no-go pill" to help aviators and special-duty personnel sleep in support of mission readiness (with a four-hour restriction on subsequent flight operation). "Ground tests" are required prior to authorization being issued to use the medication in an operational situation. The other hypnotics used as "no-go pills" are temazepam and zolpidem, which both have longer mandatory recovery periods.

See also 

 Cyclopyrrolones
 Eszopiclone
 Imidazopyridines
 Indiplon
 Necopidem
 Ocinaplon
 Pagoclone
 Pyrazolopyrimidines

References 

Acetanilides
GABAA receptor positive allosteric modulators
Nitriles
Pfizer brands
Nonbenzodiazepines
Pyrazolopyrimidines